Kuortaneenjärvi is a medium-sized lake in the Lapuanjoki main catchment area. It is located in the Southern Ostrobothnia region in Kuortane, Finland.

See also
List of lakes in Finland

References

Lakes of Kuortane